Jon Scullion (born 16 March 1995) is a Scottish professional footballer who plays as a striker for Kilbirnie Ladeside, having previously played for Greenock Morton in the Scottish Championship.

Career
Scullion started his career with Paisley side St Mirren before joining their local rivals Greenock Morton in 2014. He made his debut away at Stenhousemuir in September 2014.

He signed an extension to his original deal in May 2015 which contracted him to the club until January 2016. In December 2015, Scullion was offered an extension until the end of the season.

In May 2016, Scullion received another six-month deal with the club. This was extended further towards the end of December to take him to the end of the season. At the end of his deal, Scullion's contract was not renewed and he left the club in May 2017.

After failing to win a contract at Lowland Football League side East Kilbride, Scullion joined Ayrshire Junior side Kilbirnie Ladeside in August 2017.

In season 2020-21, Scullion had a loan spell at Yoker Athletic.

Career statistics

Honours
Morton
Scottish League One: Winners 2014–15
SPFL Development League West: Winners 2015–16

References

External links

1995 births
Living people
Footballers from Glasgow
Greenock Morton F.C. players
Association football forwards
Scottish footballers
St Mirren F.C. players
Scottish Professional Football League players
Scottish Junior Football Association players
Kilbirnie Ladeside F.C. players
West of Scotland Football League players
Yoker Athletic F.C. players